Etruridelphis is an extinct genus of cetacean.

References

Prehistoric toothed whales
Prehistoric cetacean genera
Pliocene mammals of Europe
Fossil taxa described in 2009